Edmund Lilly may refer to:
 Edmund Lilly (academic administrator)
 Edmund Lilly (painter)